Omiodes humeralis is a moth in the family Crambidae. It was described by Achille Guenée in 1854. It is found in Haiti, the Dominican Republic, Puerto Rico, Honduras, Panama, Costa Rica and Argentina.

References 

Moths described in 1854
humeralis